National Resources Board of 1934 or National Resources Planning Board was established by Franklin Roosevelt on June 30, 1934. President Roosevelt created the federal government committee by the authority of the National Industrial Recovery Act of 1933 by issuance of Executive Order 6777.

National Resources Board Purposes
The national board was entrusted as an advisory committee for natural resources information. The National Resources Committee published analysis and land-use planning reports from 1934 to 1943.

The Executive Order charged the advisory board with several proposed objectives.

 Designated Advisory Committee
Frederic Adrian Delano
Charles Edward Merriam
Wesley Clair Mitchell
Additional members may be added by order of the U.S. President
Technical committee is prohibited from a fixed membership or tenure of office as selected by the Board
 Program and plan of procedure analyzing the physical, social, governmental, and economic aspects of public policies for the development and use of land, water, and other national resources
 Board to provide a report on land and water use on or before December 1, 1934
 Program and plan shall include the coordination of projects of Federal, State, and local governments.
 Program and plan shall include the proper division of responsibility and the fair division of cost among governmental authorities

Abolishment of Associated Authorities
In pursuant of Executive Order 6777, the national resources board abolished relative federal government authorities.
 National Planning Board of Federal Emergency Administration of Public Works
 Committee on National Land Problems created by Executive Order No. 6695 on April 28, 1934

See also

1936 North American cold wave
1936 North American heat wave
Dust Bowl
Harold L. Ickes
Natural Resources Conservation Service
Rural economics
Soil conservation
Soil Conservation and Domestic Allotment Act of 1936

References

External links
 
 
 
 
 
 
 
 
 
 

New Deal agencies
Government agencies established in 1934
1934 establishments in Washington, D.C.